La Colle-sur-Loup is a commune in the Alpes-Maritimes department in southeastern France.

Population

Notable residents
 Jean-François-Maxime Raybaud (1795–1894), a philhellene officer, writer, and a participant in the War of Independence of Greece.
 Bernard Collomb (1930–2011), race car driver, lived in the town after his retirement from racing
 Daniel Pennac (born 1944), writer, spent part of his childhood in the town
 Jean-Pierre Teisseire (born 1940), politician and professional football player, was born in La Colle-sur-Loup

See also
 Communes of the Alpes-Maritimes department

References

Communes of Alpes-Maritimes
Alpes-Maritimes communes articles needing translation from French Wikipedia